Jussi Niinistö (born 27 October 1970 in Helsinki) is a Finnish politician and a former Minister of Defence. Since 2011, he has been a member of Finnish Parliament, representing the Finns Party 2011–2017 and Blue Reform since 2017. By occupation he is a military historian, a docent of Finnish history in the University of Helsinki and a docent of military history in the Finnish National Defence University. In 2013 he was elected as the first vice-chairman of the True Finns, but lost his seat in 2017.

Niinistö was a member of the municipal council of Nurmijärvi 2009–2015 and the chairman of the Finns Party deputy group of the council 2009–2014. In August 2015, Niinistö moved to Helsinki and left the municipal council. In the 2017 municipal elections Niinistö was elected to the City Council of Helsinki.

On 13 June 2017, Niinistö and 19 others left the Finns Party parliamentary group to found the New Alternative parliamentary group, which would later become the Blue Reform party. He took part in the 2019 parliamentary election as a candidate of the Blue Reform, but was not elected.

Jussi Niinistö is not related to President Sauli Niinistö nor his nephew, Green MP Ville Niinistö, and their family names have different origins.

In June 2020 Niinistö was elected as town manager of the small town of Kannus.

Publications
Paavo Susitaival 1896–1993. Aktivismi elämänasenteena. Bibliotheca Historica 29. Helsinki: Suomen Historiallinen Seura, 1998. .
Suomalaisia soturikohtaloita. Jyväskylä: Suomalaisuuden liitto, 1998. .
Kiinteistöjen liputustieto. Helsinki: Suomalaisuuden liitto, 1999. .
Niinistö, Jussi & Mattila, Jukka I.: Pohjan Pojat. Kuvahistoria suomalaisen vapaaehtoisrykmentin vaiheista Viron vapaussodassa 1919. Helsinki: LAK-Kustannus, 1999. .
Bobi Sivén. Karjalan puolesta. Helsinki: Suomalaisen Kirjallisuuden Seura, 2001. .
Suomalaisia vapaustaistelijoita. Sotilasperinteen seuran julkaisusarja nro 9. Helsinki: Nimox, 2003. .
Lapuan Liike. Kuvahistoria kansannoususta 1929–1932. Helsinki: Nimox Ky, 2003. .
Heimosotien historia 1918–1922. Suomalaisen Kirjallisuuden Seuran toimituksia 1007. Helsinki: Suomalaisen Kirjallisuuden Seura, 2005. .
"Suomalaisuuden Liiton vaiheita 1906–2006", teoksessa Tala, Heikki (päätoim.): Vuosisata suomalaisuuden puolesta: Suomalaisuuden liitto 1906–2006. Helsinki: Suomalaisuuden liitto, 2006. .
Eteläpohjalaiset ja Suomen vapaustaistelu, Rauhan ajan suojeluskunta- ja lottajärjestöt, Eteläpohjalaiset talvi- ja jatkosodassa sekä Tyytymättömän oikeiston tukialue -nimiset luvut (yhteensä 127 sivua) kokoomateoksessa Etelä-Pohjanmaan historia VII (Etelä-Pohjanmaan liitto. Toim. Raimo Salokangas. Vaasa 2006)
Isontalon Antti. Eteläpohjalainen jääkäri, värväri ja seitsemän sodan veteraani. Helsinki: Suomalaisen Kirjallisuuden Seura, 2008. .
hundreds of articles related to history and social affairs, columns and book evaluations in different magazines.

External links
 Parliament of Finland: Jussi Niinistö 
 Home page 
 Jussi Niinistö in 375 humanists. Faculty of Arts, University of Helsinki. 15.7.2015.

Sources

1970 births
Living people
Politicians from Helsinki
Finnish Lutherans
Finns Party politicians
Blue Reform politicians
Ministers of Defence of Finland
Members of the Parliament of Finland (2011–15)
Members of the Parliament of Finland (2015–19)
University of Helsinki alumni